Alfred Thomas Elwes (A. T. Elwes) (c. 1841– c.1917) was a British Natural History illustrator of mammals and birds. For most of his life he lived and worked in England, illustrating for Illustrated London News as well as various natural history books of the nineteenth century.

Life and Work
Elwes was born in Leghorn, Italy around 1841. From 1872 to 1877 he was employed by the Illustrated London News as the chief draftsman of natural history subjects.  In 1882 Elwes wrote How to draw animals, birds and dogs.  He died sometime after 1911 probably around 1917 in Willesden, Middlesex.

Family 
Elwes was married in Gravesend, Kent on the 15th of October 1973 to Kate Barnard.

Books illustrated by Elwes  

 Neptune: Or The Autobiography Of A Newfoundland Dog (1869) by E. Burrows
 The Pleasant History of Reynard the Fox (1873) Translated by Thomas Roscoe
 A Ride Through Hostile Africa: With Adventures Among The Boers (1881) by Parker Gillmore
 Encounters With Wild Beasts (1881) by Parker Gillmore
 How to draw animals, birds and dogs (1882) by A. T. Elwes
 The Amphibion's voyage (1885) by Parker Gillmore
 Uncle Remus (1888) by Joel Chandler Harris
 The birds of our rambles : A companion for the country (1891) by Charles Dixon
 A Book of Drawings (1891) by A. Bryan, L. Davis, A. T. Elwes et al.
 The Game Birds And Wild Fowl Of The British Islands: Being A Handbook For The Naturalist And Sportsman (1893) by Charles Dixon.
 Birds' nests; an introduction to the science of caliology (1902) by Charles Dixon.
 Chatterbox (1904) by et al. W. P. Pycraft
 Wonders of the bird world (1921)  by Richard Bowdler Sharpe.

References 

British artists
British illustrators
Scientific illustrators
British bird artists